is a Japanese architect.

He was born in Shizuoka, Japan. He worked with Renzo Piano for twenty years in Europe, from the designing construction supervision of the Centre Georges Pompidou in Paris.

In 1988, Okabe, then the representative of Renzo Piano Building Workshop in Japan, won the international competition of Kansai International Airport Terminal Building and was responsible for the design and construction supervision. While not currently on display, the Museum of Modern Art holds a model of the building's main structural truss in its Architecture and Design department.

After the construction of the Terminal Building, he established Noriaki Okabe Architecture Network in 1995 in Tokyo. While Okabe's practice has since expanded beyond architecture into industrial design, including the Odakyu 50000 series VSE train. In 2009 he collaborated with Belgian architect Jean-Michel Jaspers in designing the Belgian Embassy in Tokyo.

Notable projects
 Kansai International Airport Terminal Building, Renzo Piano Building Workshop Japan, Osaka
 Ushibuka Haiya Bridge, Renzo Piano Building Workshop Japan, Nagasaki, Japan
 Housing in Sakura-shinmachi, Tokyo, Japan
 Valeo Unisia Transmissions Atsugi (factory), Kanagawa, Japan
 Odakyu 50000 series VSE train design
 Odakyu 60000 series MSE train design
 Belgian Embassy, Tokyo, Japan (collaboration with Belgian landscape architect Aldrik Heirman)
 Hakone Tozan 3000 series train design
 Odakyu 30000 series EXEα train refurbishment programme from fiscal 2016
 Odakyu 70000 series train design

References

External links 
 Noriaki Okabe Architecture Network official site

1947 births
Living people
Japanese architects